Aglaia foveolata is a species of tropical tree in the family Meliaceae. This plant occurs in Brunei, Indonesia, and Malaysia. It produces edible fruit. The bark contains silvestrol which is a potent inhibitor of ebola virus and Zika Virus replication.

References

foveolata
Near threatened plants
Taxonomy articles created by Polbot